The Official Star Wars Fan Film Awards was an annual contest put forth by Lucasfilm and AtomFilms to showcase and acknowledge the growing genre of fan films made by, for, and about fans of the Star Wars saga. The inaugural contest in 2002 was the first time Lucasfilm had officially sanctioned the genre. In 2007, the contest was renamed the Star Wars Fan Movie Challenge. In 2012, Lucasfilm announced that the contest was being discontinued, and that the company was looking for "new ways for fans to share their creativity".

Lucasfilm later announced, via the official Star Wars website, that the Fan Film Awards would return in 2014, for the first time in three years, welcoming different genres and styles. The best short films of that year were screened at Star Wars Celebration 2015 in Anaheim, California. The awards were last held in 2018.

Awards

Rules 
A number of guidelines ensure that entries are produced by amateurs and do not infringe on Lucasfilm properties. The contest limits the content of entries to short film and video parodies, mockumentaries, and documentaries of the Star Wars universe and fan experience. Until 2007, In-universe fan fiction-type stories were not allowed. Rules changed in 2007 after all Star Wars movies have been released and fan fiction is now allowed. The contest imposes a time limit on entries - for the inaugural contest, it was 30 minutes, but this was lowered to 15 for the 2003-2005 contests. For 2006 and 2007, the time limit was lowered again to 10 minutes. Entries must not contain nudity, excessive swearing, explicit sexual themes or graphic violence. In addition, no unlicensed copyrighted material may be used in the entries, with the exception of a collection of approved images, music and sound effects . For 2006 onward, the contest rules were revised to prohibit contributions that are subject to or under the "jurisdiction of any guild or union collective bargaining agreement." (This does not, however, prevent a contestant from submitting an entry if they happen to belong to a union. For example, an amateur film-maker who is also a truck driver that is a member of the Teamsters.)

Presentation 
The awards have been presented at ceremonies held at either Comic-Con International or Lucas' Star Wars Celebration conventions. For the first contest in 2002, Kevin Smith hosted a special on the SciFi Channel to showcase the winners and some finalists. Winning films have been shown online at starwars.com, atom.com, and some have appeared on SpikeTV. In October 2008, a selection of winning films was shown in a special Star Wars Fan Movie Challenge-themed episode of Atom TV on Comedy Central.

Categories 
The contest's grand prize is the George Lucas Selects Award, which is presented to the film Lucas himself selects as his favorite. The Audience Choice Award is selected by the worldwide internet audience, as all contest finalists are available to view online at Atom.com. The Pioneer Award is given to a film that either defined, changed, or influenced the genre. Other awards are given by a jury of people selected from employees of Atom.com and Lucasfilm. Beginning in 2004, some of the major awards were sponsored by Lucasfilm licensees.

Winners

2002 
George Lucas Selects Award – Christmas Tauntauns; Matt Bagshaw, director
Audience Choice Award – Star Wars Gangsta Rap; Thomas Lee, director
Best Animation – Jar Jar's Walking Papers; Joe Fournier, director
Best Documentary – Waiting for Jar Jar; Meredith Bragg, director
Best Mockumentary – SW Project; Gregory Hiltz, director
Spirit of Fandom Award – Figure Club; Matt Petrilla, director
Young Jedi Award – Sparring Program; David Tomaszewski, director
Best Comedy – Stargeeks;  Marc A. Samson, director
Best Short Subject – A New Dope; Chris Gortz, director
Pioneer Award – Troops; Kevin Rubio, director

2003 
George Lucas Selects Award – Pink Five; Trey Stokes, director
Audience Choice Award – The Jedi Hunter; John E. Hudgens, director
Skywalker Sound Award – Carbonite; Mark Rusciano, director
Best Animation – Trooper Clerks; Jeff Allen, director
Spirit of Fandom Award – Silent But Deadly#2; Lou Tambone, Jeff Cioletti, directors
Best Commercial Parody – Dark Side Switch Campaign; Daniel Johnson, director
Pioneer Award – Hardware Wars; Ernie Fosselius, director

2004 
George Lucas Selects Award – Escape from Tatooine; David Tomaszewski, director
Audience Choice Award – Pink Five Strikes Back; Trey Stokes, director
Best Comedy – Recruitment; Scott Zier, director
Best Animation – Wampa; Andreas Peterson, director
Spirit of Fandom Award – 8 Minutes; Wendy Woody, director
Best Crossover Spoof – Carbonite Confusion; Ryan Simmons, director
Pioneer Award – George Lucas in Love; Joe Nussbaum, director

2005 
George Lucas Selects Award – For the Love of the Film; Barry Curtis & Troy Metcalf, directors
Audience Choice Award – Sith Apprentice; John E. Hudgens, director
Spirit of Fandom Award – Boba; Mark Rusciano, director
Best Animation – Walk in a Bamboo Bush; Tetsuro Sakai, director
Best Comedy – Cheap Seats; Robert Reeves, director
Best Crossover Spoof – Anakin Dynamite; Wayne Barnes, director
Best Original Concept – Star Wars: Elements; Robert Bunch, director
Best Original Song – One Season More; Timothy Edward Smith, director
Pioneer Award – Return of the Ewok; David Tomblin, director

2006 
George Lucas Selects Award – Pitching Lucas; Shane Felux, director
Audience Choice Award – Pitching Lucas; Shane Felux, director
Spirit of Fandom Award – Memoirs of a Padawan; Michael Q. Yowhan, director
Best Comedy – Sith'd; Brian Silva, director
Best Commercial Parody – Blue Milk; William Grammer, director

2007 
George Lucas Selects Award – Chad Vader - Day Shift Manager; Blame Society Productions, director
Audience Choice Award – Forced Alliance; Randolph Bookman & Gerry Santos, directors
Best Short Subject – Incident at Toshi Station; Tyler Soper, director
Best Animation – IG-88: The Dancing Robot; Anton Bogaty, director
Best Action – Essence of the Force; Pat Kerby, director
Best Comedy – The Eyes of Darth Tater; Lee Vehe, director
Best Fan Fiction – Forced Alliance; Randolph Bookman & Gerry Santos, directors

2008 
 George Lucas Selects Award – Padmé; Robert Reeves, director
 Audience Choice Award – George Lucas Hip-Hop Awards; Kay Minckiewicz & Mark Minckiewicz, directors
 Best Comedy – Paraphrase Theater; Will Carlough, director
 Best Visual Effects – Ryan vs. Dorkman 2; Ryan Wieber & Michael Scott, directors
 Best Creature / Character Makeup – Contract of Evil; Lou Klein, director
 Best Short Subject – The Empire Strikes Back in 60 Seconds; Oliver Jones, director
 Best Parody – Star Wars Grindhouse: Don’t Go In The Endor Woods; Michael Ramova, director
 Best Animation – George Lucas Hip-Hop Awards; Kay Minckiewicz & Mark Minckiewicz, directors

2009 
 George Lucas Selects Award - Star Wars Retold; Joseph Nicolosi, director
 Audience Choice Award - Saber; Clare Grant, Rileah Vanderbilt, Adam Green and Mike Civitano
 Best Action Award - Saber; Clare Grant, Rileah Vanderbilt, Adam Green and Mike Civitano
 Spirit of Fandom Award -  Star Wars: Cinemagic;  Joe Presswood, director
 Best Comedy Award - [[Star Wars: Episode XVI - Family Dysfuction']]; Rich Scheirmann, director
 Best Animation Award - Star Wars in a Notebook; Oscar Triana, director
 Best Parody Award - Star Sports: Episode M - Theatrical Trailer; Jeff Capone, director

 2010 
 George Lucas Selects Award - The Unconscious Sith; Adam White
 Audience Choice Award - Renaissance (Redux); 
 Best Action Heroes Award - Chronicles of Young Skywalker; 
 Spirit of Fandom Award - Star Wars 70s Animation; 
 Best Animation Award - The Solo Adventures; 
 Best Sequel Award - The Notebook Strikes Back; Oscar Triana, director
 Best Cinematography Award - Makazie One;

 2011 
George Lucas Selects Award – Star Wars: Unlimited Power; Eliot Sirota, director
Audience Choice Award – A Light in the Darkness; Fed Wetherbee, director
Spirit of Fandom – The Tentacle Trap; James Austen, director
Best Acting – Star Wars: Hunter; Sash Nixon, director 
Best Animated Feature – Bounty Hunter II: Pit of Carkoon; Jim Mehsling, director
Best Comedy – Solo Forever; Trey Albright, director
Best Fan Fiction – A Light in the Darkness; Fed Wetherbee, director
Best Sequel – The Unconscious Sith Strikes Back; Adam White, director

 2015 
Filmmaker Select Award – Star Wars: The Lesser Evil; Sy Cody White & Andrew Kin, directors
Audience Choice Award – Journey of a Fan Film"; Alexander Watson, director
Best Non-Fiction Award – "Journey of a Fan Film; Alexander Watson, director
Best Comedy Award – Bounty Buddies; Jordan & Cody Gustafson, directors
Best Animation Award – "Star Wars: A New Employee Orientation; Collin Murphy & Jared Hundley, directors
Spirit of Fandom Award – Force-Full Imagination; Jim Eimmerman, director
Best Visual Effects – Knights of the Old Republic: Broken Souls''; Jared Seaich, director

2016 
Filmmaker Select Award - "TK-436: A Stormtrooper Story"; Samgoma Edwards & Samtubia Edwards, directors
Audience Choice Award - "The Sable Corsair"; Nick Finch & Jeffrey Henderson, directors
Best Non-Fiction Award – "Force or Faith"
Best Comedy Award – "Ben in the Desert - Jawas are Bad Neighbors"; Kevin Kelly, director
Best Animation Award - "The Big Question"; Stefan Binter & Fabian Carl, directors
Spirit of Fandom Award – "Star Wars: Generations"; Don Bitters III, director
Best Visual Effects – "Star Malice Wars"

2018

Long Form
Filmmaker Select Award - "More Machine Than Man"
Audience Choice Award - "Like My Father Before Me"
Best Animation Award - "The Kessel Run"
Best Choreography Award - "Exile"
Best Comedy Award – "More Machine Than Man"
Spirit of Fandom Award – "Star Wars: The Toys Awaken"; Raymond Montemayor, director
Best Stop Motion Award – "Star Wars: The Toys Awaken"; Raymond Montemayor, director
Best Visual Effects Award – "Exile"

Short Form
Filmmaker Select Award - "Ice Cream To Go"
Audience Choice Award - "Vader: Misquoted"
Best Animation Award - "Grievious versus Praetorians"
Best Choreography Award - "Grievious versus Praetorians"
Best Comedy Award – "Ice Cream To Go"
Spirit of Fandom Award – "Simple Tricks and Nonsense"
Best Stop Motion Award – "Ice Cream To Go"
Best Visual Effects – "A Close Call"

See also
Star Wars Mini Movie Awards

References

External links 
Official Website
UK Official Website
Germany Official Website
Mexico Official Website
TheForce.net - Fan film hosting site

American film awards
Science fiction awards
Fan films based on Star Wars